The Col. John Critz Farm Springhouse was a historic farm outbuilding in rural western White County, Arkansas.  It was located northwest of Searcy on the south side of County Road 818.  It was a single-story masonry structure, fashioned out of a combination of cut and rustic rubble stone and covered by a gabled roof.  The westernmost part of the building, which housed the well, was enclosed in wooden latticework, with a latticework door providing access.  Built in 1858, it was the oldest known springhouse in the county, and was also unusual for its mixed stone construction.

The building was listed on the National Register of Historic Places in 1992.  It has been listed as destroyed in the Arkansas Historic Preservation Program database.

See also
Center Valley Well House: NRHP-listed in Pope County, Arkansas
National Register of Historic Places listings in White County, Arkansas

References

Infrastructure completed in 1858
Spring houses
National Register of Historic Places in White County, Arkansas
Agricultural buildings and structures on the National Register of Historic Places in Arkansas
1858 establishments in Arkansas
Water supply infrastructure in Arkansas
Springs of Arkansas